Tomislav Čošković (born 22 April 1979) is a Bosnian-born Croatian and Turkish volleyball player. He is 199 cm. He plays for Galatasaray as outside hitter since 2012 season start and wear 12 number.

On 16 July 2010, it was announced that Turkish President Abdullah Gül signed Čošković's Turkish citizenship papers and he has Turkish citizenship. He will play for Turkey if FIVB will let him play.

He is currently an assistant coach to the Croatia men's national volleyball team and co-leading volleyball camp for ProVolley with Tamara Sušić.

Past career
 2000–2001  Palermo
 2001–2002  Hypo Tirol Innsbruck
 2002–2004  Rennes Étudiants Club
 2004–2005  Tourcoing Lille Métropole
 2005–2006  Olympiacos SC
 2006–2007  Lokomotiv Novosibirsk
 2007–2012  Fenerbahçe SK
 2012–present  Galatasaray SK

Honours and awards
 2007-08 Turkish Men's Volleyball League Champion
 2008-09 Turkish Men's Volleyball League runner-up
 2009-10 Turkish Men's Volleyball League Champion
 2010-11 Turkish Men's Volleyball League Champion
 2008-09 Turkish Cup Champion
 2009-10 Balkan Champion

References

1979 births
Croatian expatriate sportspeople in Turkey
Croatian men's volleyball players
Croats of Bosnia and Herzegovina
Galatasaray S.K. (men's volleyball) players
Living people
Naturalized citizens of Turkey
Olympiacos S.C. players
Turkish people of Bosnia and Herzegovina descent
Turkish people of Croatian descent